Tadas Klimavičius (born 10 October 1982) is a Lithuanian professional basketball player, who last played for Vytautas Prienai-Birštonas of the Lithuanian Basketball League. He is a power forward. He also represented Lithuania national basketball team internationally.

Professional career
Klimavičius played for BC Žalgiris, BC Alita, Fabriano Basket early in his career, before having breakout seasons with BC Šiauliai, helping them win LKL bronze medals in 2006 and 2007, BBL bronze medals in 2006, and helping Šiauliai in FIBA EuroChallenge competition. After a successful season G.S. Olympia Larissa B.C., Klimavičius returned to Žalgiris Kaunas. After a difficult 2008-2009 season for the team, Klimavičius played his most successful season with Žalgiris, becoming one of the best players on the team, and helping the team in matches in the Euroleague and against BC Lietuvos rytas, winning the BBL championship in 2010.

Klimavičius has signed a new contract and will stay with Žalgiris Kaunas for 2010–2011 season, with an option to prolong the contract for the 2011–2012 season. In 2014, Klimavičius signed with Telekom Baskets Bonn of Basketball Bundesliga.

On 4 August 2016 it was announced that Klimavičius signed with Neptūnas Klaipėda of the Lithuanian Basketball League.

On 24 January 2017 Klimavičius signed with Vytautas Prienai-Birštonas shortly after terminating his contract with Neptūnas. He became an important part in the Vytautas rotation, and helped the team to win the 2017 BBL championship. He left Vytautas in January, after suffering some injuries.

Lithuanian national team
At the 2010 FIBA World Championship he played for the Lithuanian national basketball team, which won Bronze medals.

Career statistics

Euroleague

|-
| style="text-align:left;" | 2002–03
| style="text-align:left;" | Žalgiris
| 4 || 0 || 5.5 || .500 || .333 || .000 || .8 || .0 || .3 || .0 || 1.8 || .3
|-
| style="text-align:left;" | 2008–09
| style="text-align:left;" | Žalgiris
| 10 || 0 || 13.0 || .548 || .000 || .375 || 3.2 || .3 || .4 || .6 || 3.7 || 4.2
|-
| style="text-align:left;" | 2009–10
| style="text-align:left;" | Žalgiris
| 14 || 6 || 25.2 || .429 || .367 || .675 || 4.1 || .8 || .1 || .9 || 7.7 || 7.8
|-
| style="text-align:left;" | 2010–11
| style="text-align:left;" | Žalgiris
| 16 || 7 || 16.0 || .462 || .231 || .727 || 2.9 || .4 || .3 || .3 || 3.9 || 2.4
|-
| style="text-align:left;" | 2011–12
| style="text-align:left;" | Žalgiris
| 16 || 0 || 15.0 || .333 || .235 || .333 || 3.2 || .6 || .1 || .4 || 2.2 || 2.6
|-
| style="text-align:left;" | 2013–14
| style="text-align:left;" | Žalgiris
| 22 || 3 || 13.5 || .514 || .111 || .609 || 3.7 || 1.2 || .3 || .4 || 4.2 || 6.0

Awards and achievements
 2010 FIBA World Championship, Turkey – Bronze medalist

References

External links

1982 births
Living people
BC Žalgiris players
Lithuanian expatriate basketball people in Germany
Lithuanian men's basketball players
BC Neptūnas players
Power forwards (basketball)
Basketball players from Kaunas
Telekom Baskets Bonn players
2010 FIBA World Championship players